Integrin subunit beta like 1 is a protein that in humans is encoded by the ITGBL1 gene.

Function

This gene encodes a beta integrin-related protein that is a member of the EGF-like protein family. The encoded protein contains integrin-like cysteine-rich repeats. Alternative splicing results in multiple transcript variants. [provided by RefSeq, Nov 2012].

References

Further reading